Muladi is an Upazila of Barishal District in the Division of Barishal, Bangladesh.

Geography
It has a total area of 261.02 km2. It borders Gosairhat Upazila on the north, Barisal Sadar Upazila on the south, Hizla and Mehendiganj Upazilas on the east and Kalkini, Gournadi and Babuganj Upazilas on the west.

History
Following the Conquest of Bakla in the early 17th-century, Emperor Jahangir awarded parts of Chandradwip to Ulfat Ghazi for his participation, and these areas became the Nazirpur pargana of Bakla. His son, Syed Qutb Shah, first settled in the village of Terachar in present-day Muladi. He was renowned for his Muslim missionary activities across Barisal, Madaripur and Bagerhat. He also dug reservoirs and ponds and built mosques for the welfare of locals. A large pond was excavated by Syed Qutb Shah in Terachar but has now been submerged with the Arial Khan River. Qutb Shah subsequently migrated to Nalchira due to the unsafe conditions in Terachar and his descendants continued to hold influential positions in the history of Barisal for several centuries.

Demographics

According to the 2011 Bangladesh census, Muladi Upazila had 38,394 households and a population of 174,775, 18.5% of whom lived in urban areas. 11.1% of the population was under the age of 5. The literacy rate (age 7 and over) was 56.0%, compared to the national average of 51.8%.
The people of Muladi are 98.12% muslim,1.86% Hindu.

Main occupations 
51.17% of the population work in agriculture, 20.67% as agricultural labourers, 3.18% as wage labourers, 7.52% in commerce, 7.13% in services, 2.5% in fishing and 7.83% in other occupations.

Land use 
Cultivable land covers 26159.45 hectares and fallow land 237.56 hectares; single crop 42%, double crop 50% and treble crop land 8%. 74% of cultivable land is under irrigation.

Land control 
Among the peasants, 29% are landless, 7.09% marginal, 32.82% small, 27% intermediate and 4.09% rich; cultivable land per head 0.14 hectare.

Land value 
The market value of land of the first grade is approximately 5000 Tk per 0.01 hectares.

Crops and fruits
The main crops are Paddy, wheat, sweet potatoes, pulses, brinjal and betel leaves, and the main fruits are mangoes, jackfruits, bananas, blackberries, coconuts, lychee, palms, betel nuts and amra. The extinct or nearly extinct crops are Jute, tobacco, mustard seeds, groundnuts, garlic, sugar cane, arahar, china and kaun.

Administration
Muladi thana was established in 1967 and was turned into an upazila in 1983.

Muladi Upazila is divided into Muladi Municipality and seven union parishads: Batamara, Char Kalekhan, Gachhua, Kazir Char, Muladi, Nazirpur, and Safipur. The union parishads are subdivided into 77 mauzas and 102 villages.

Upazila Chairman : Tariqul Hasan Khan Mithu

Woman Vice Chairman :Samima Nasrin

Vice Chairman :

Upazila Nirbahi Officer (UNO) : Nur Mohammad Hossaini

Education
There are 6 colleges, 30 high schools,  5 junior schools, 78 government primary schools, 50 non-government primary schools, 17 madrasas and a kindergarten. The noted educational institutions are Bheduriachar Government Primary School (1892) and Tayak Tomchar Government Primary School (1845).

Educational institutions in Muladi Upazila include:
 Muladi Govt. College
 Charlakhsmipur Fazil Madrasah (Established -1937)
 Laxmipur High School (Established:1964), Luxmipur
 Patarchar Luxmipur Govt. Primary School (Est. 1911)
 Laxmipur Govt.Primary School (Established:1956), Luxmipur
 Arif Mahmud Degree College
 Muladi M.J Govt. High School (Bir Sreshtho and martyr of Bangladesh Liberation War Mohiuddin Jahangir was a student of this school)
 Purba Hosnad Moha Biddaloy, Gachua, Hosnabad
 Gachua Abdul Kader High School (Established: 1971)
 Paiksha Hosnabad High School, Paiksha
 Muladi Islamia Senior Madrassa
 South Kazirchar High School (Established: 1939)
 Kazirchar Secondary School (established: 1939)
 Bahadurpur Fazlur Rahim Sharif Secondary School (Established: 1963)
 Nazirpur United Degree College
 Nazirpur High School
 Nazirpur Girls' School
 Jalalpur Secondary School
 Nazirpur Boro Bari Shikhon School
 Ramarpole Aferuddin Memorial High School (founded by Mohammad Abul Kashem Laal Miah Mridha)
 A.B.R. High School, Alimabad, Jagorani High School, Tayka
 Islamia Shishu Shodon (orphanage), founded by Faruqe Ahmed at East Nazirpur,
 Banimordon High School, Banimordon
 Charpadma Rashidia islamia fazil madrasha,Safipur
 Banimordon Fazil Madrassa
 Shaheed Altaf Mahamud Secondary School.
 VP-Md. Rana Khan-Charkalekhan Ideal Degree College
 Charkalekhan Ideal High School
 Charkalekhan Nesaria Fazil Madrasa
 Sayeder Gaon High School (Established:1928)
 BDCH Complex including a High School & a government Primary School (Established; 1993)
 Balarampur Govt. Primary School, Balarampur 
 Safipur High School
 Safipur Govt. Primary School (Established; 1921) 
 Haji Badrul Hossain Degree College

Notable residents
Altaf Mahmud (he was a musician, cultural activist, and martyred freedom fighter of the Bangladesh Liberation War).

See also
Upazilas of Bangladesh
Districts of Bangladesh
Divisions of Bangladesh

References

External links

Upazilas of Barisal District